Mario Mendoza (born 7 July 1938) is a Guatemalan boxer. He competed in the men's bantamweight event at the 1968 Summer Olympics. At the 1968 Summer Olympics, he lost to Chang Kyou-chul of South Korea.

References

External links
 

1938 births
Living people
Guatemalan male boxers
Olympic boxers of Guatemala
Boxers at the 1968 Summer Olympics
Sportspeople from Guatemala City
Bantamweight boxers